Alucita pusilla is a moth of the family Alucitidae. It is found in Japan.

References

Moths described in 1984
Alucitidae
Moths of Japan